Susan Rachel Margaret Morris (born 30 May 1958) is a New Zealand former cricketer who played as a right-arm medium bowler. She appeared in eight One Day Internationals for New Zealand, all at the 1988 World Cup. She played domestic cricket for Auckland.

References

External links

1958 births
Living people
New Zealand women cricketers
New Zealand women One Day International cricketers
Cricketers from Auckland
Auckland Hearts cricketers